Charkhestaneh (also Romanized as Charkhestāneh; also known as Charkhestān) is a village in Kashkan Rural District, Shahivand District, Dowreh County, Lorestan Province, Iran. At the 2006 census, its population was 141, in 33 families.

References 

Towns and villages in Dowreh County